Yulia Yasenok or Yuliya Yasionak (born July 9, 1983) is a Belarusian long track speed skater who participates in international competitions.

Personal records

Career highlights

European Allround Championships
2004 - Heerenveen, 24th
2005 - Heerenveen, 25th
2006 - Hamar, 25th
2007 - Collalbo, 21st
2008 - Kolomna,  19th
World Junior Allround Championships
2000 - Seinäjoki, 39th
2001 - Groningen, 26th

External links

Yasenok at Jakub Majerski's Speedskating Database
Yasenok at SkateResults.com

1983 births
Belarusian female speed skaters
Living people